The Frick Art Reference Library Photoarchive is a study collection of more than one million photographic reproductions of works of art from the fourth to the mid-twentieth century by over 40,000 artists trained in the Western tradition located in the Frick Art Reference Library on the Upper East Side of Manhattan. It was founded in 1920 by Helen Clay Frick, the daughter of industrialist Henry Clay Frick, to facilitate object-oriented research. The documentation it offers records the essential elements of the biography of the work of art: the artist, title, present owner, as well as historical information such as changes of attribution, ownership and condition, all of which are essential for the study of the history of art.

History
Until the 1920s, reproductions were only rarely included in art historical texts. The Frick's Photoarchive was established to complement this growing body of literature. Although many scholars had personal image libraries, the Frick Art Reference Library was one of the first institutions to afford public access to a consolidated collection of photographs, thus enabling a broad range of researchers to study and evaluate works of art in an entirely new way. The establishment of similar Art Historical Photo Archives in Europe and the United States soon followed.

In planning the Photoarchive, Helen Clay Frick regularly consulted with Sir Robert Witt, whose personal library of reproductions in London was her single most important source of inspiration. She also turned to American and European scholars, including Fiske Kimball and Bernard Berenson. As early as 1922, Frick organized photographic expeditions to capture images of significant and rarely reproduced works of art in Europe and the United States. The resulting collection of roughly 60,000 original negatives, which in many cases document works of art that have subsequently been altered, lost or destroyed, has become one of the library's most treasured resources.

To facilitate object-oriented research, the library actively acquires multiple photographs of the same work of art to document changes in condition and appearance over time. Photographs of preparatory drawings, versions, copies, pastiches, and forgeries—materials often overlooked in the literature—are also collected. Many of the photographs in the collection are rare images of works that have since been lost, stolen, or destroyed.

The library continues to acquire many photographs and digital images each year, focusing on unpublished or little-known works. Staff photoarchivists work to maintain current information on changes of attribution and location, often relying on information provided by art researchers.

Access
All 40,000 artists represented in the Photoarchive and documentation of over 200,000 works of art are accessible through NYARC Discovery, the catalog of the New York Art Resources Consortium (NYARC).

The Frick Digital Collections provides access to approximately 200,000 high-resolution digital images for 75,000 works of art represented in the Photoarchive. Additionally, digital images of nearly half of the library's 55,000 original negatives are published online through the ARTstor digital library.

Photoarchive materials can be consulted on site at the Frick Art Reference Library during regular business hours. Over 420,000 of the photographs and their accompanying documentation are indexed by artist name, subject, and owner in an on-site card catalog.

See also
 List of online image archives

References

Sources 
 Reist, Inge Jackson. "The Frick Photoarchive: A Treasury of Unpublished Images of Works of Art." Frick Collection Members' Magazine (Fall 2003): 9-11.
 Knox, Katharine McCook. The Story of the Frick Art Reference Library: The Early Years. New York: The Library, 1979. OCLC 5196423.

External links 
 "Frick Art Reference Library Photoarchive Records Now Online". Retrieved 10 September 2013.
 Frick Art Reference Library Photoarchive
 Frick Art Reference Library on Internet Archive
 FRESCO - The Frick Research Catalog Online
 Frick Digital Collections

Photo archives in the United States
Frick Collection
Frick Art Reference Library